Transistor Radio is the fourth studio album by M. Ward.

The first track is an instrumental cover of a track from The Beach Boys album Pet Sounds.

The track "Here Comes the Sun Again" is featured in the commercial for the 2007 Cadillac SRX Crossover. It was also played in the background during the second episode of Eli Stone.  The track "I'll Be Yr Bird" was used in the movie The Go-Getter. The song "One Life Away" was featured prominently in the beginning of an episode of the TV series Dollhouse. The song "Lullaby + Exile" was used briefly in an episode of Atypical.

Track listing
All songs by Matt Ward except where noted.
 "You Still Believe in Me" (Brian Wilson, Tony Asher) – 2:24
 "One Life Away" – 1:57
 "Sweethearts on Parade" (Carmen Lombardo, Charles Newman) – 2:12
 "Hi-Fi" – 4:14
 "Fuel for Fire" – 4:12
 "Four Hours in Washington" – 3:01
 "Regeneration No.1" – 1:18
 "Big Boat" – 2:45
 "Paul's Song" – 3:10
 "Radio Campaign" – 2:36
 "Here Comes the Sun Again" – 2:21
 "Deep Dark Well" – 2:25
 "Oh Take Me Back" – 2:07
 "I'll Be Yr Bird" – 2:54
 "Lullaby + Exile" – 2:44
 "Well-Tempered Clavier" (Johann Sebastian Bach) – 2:58

Charts

References

2005 albums
M. Ward albums